The following is a list of notable individuals associated with the Indiana University of Pennsylvania (IUP), and includes alumni, presidents, faculty, and staff.

Presidents

IUP's executive has changed names and roles with the evolving institution. The original title for the chief executive was "principal" while "president" was reserved for John Sutton as presiding officer of Indiana Normal School's Board of Trustees.

President, Indiana University of Pennsylvania (1965–present)
Michael A. Driscoll, beginning July 1, 2012
David J. Werner, 2010–2012 (interim)
Tony Atwater, 2005–2010
Diane Reinhard, 2004 (interim)
Mark J. Staszkiewicz, 2004 (acting)
Derek Hodgson, 2003–2004
Lawrence K. Pettit, 1992–2003
Charles Fuget, 1991–1992 (interim)
John D. Welty, 1984 (interim), 1984–1991
John E. Worthen, 1979–1984
Bernard J. Ganley, 1979 (interim)
Robert C. Wilburn, 1975–1979
William W. Hassler, 1969–1975

President, Indiana State College (1959–1965)
John Davis, 1962 (acting)

President, Indiana State Teachers College (1927–1959)
Willis E. Pratt, 1948–1968
Ralph E. Heiges, 1948 (acting)
Joseph M. Uhler, 1942–1947
Leroy A. King, 1939–1942
Samuel Fausold, 1937–1939
Charles R. Foster, 1927–1936

Principal, Indiana Normal School (1875–1927)
John A. H. Keith, 1917–1927
James E. Ament, 1907–1917
David Jewtt Waller, 1893–1907
Charles Deane, 1891–1893
Z. X. Snyder, 1888–1891
Leonard H. Durling, 1881–1888
John H. French, 1878–1881
David M. Sensenig, 1876–1878
Edmund B. Fairfield, 1875–1876

Notable faculty

Professors
Gawdat Bahgat - political science (1995–2009)
Eileen Glisan - Spanish, president of the American Council on the Teaching of Foreign Languages for 2010
Jack Stamp - composer

Coaches
Curt Cignetti - head football coach since 2011; son of Frank Cignetti, Sr.; former assistant coach at the University of Alabama
Frank Cignetti Sr. - head football coach 1986–2005; the university's winningest coach, leading the football team to two NCAA Division II Football Championship games
Chuck Klausing - head football coach 1964–1969; College Football Hall of Fame; 19th winningest coach in National Collegiate Athletic Association (NCAA) football history
Lou Tepper - head football coach 2006–2011; former head coach at University of Illinois Urbana-Champaign and PennWest Edinboro
Joe Lombardi - head men's basketball coach since 2006; former assistant coach at University of Pittsburgh

Other
Job of Chicago -  Archbishop of the Orthodox Church in America Diocese of the Midwest, former director of the university's Orthodox Christian Fellowship

Notable alumni

Notable alumni of Indiana University of Pennsylvania and its predecessor institutions have included members of the United States Congress, state and federal political officials, business officials, professional athletes and coaches, educational leaders, and a NASA astronaut.

Business
Gregory Booth (1971) - president and CEO of Zippo Manufacturing Company
Tim Burns (1990) - pharmaceutical technology, politician
Marla Sabo (1979) - former president and COO of Christian Dior

Politics

Education
Charles Kupchella (1964) - President of University of North Dakota (1999–2008)
Dana D. Nelson (1984) - Professor of English and Department Chair, Vanderbilt University
Gary A. Olson (Ph.D. 1980) - President-designate of Daemen College (2013–present)
Jack Thomas (Ph.D. 1990) - Provost of Western Illinois University (2008–2011), president of Western Illinois University (2011–2019)
Gerald L. Zahorchak (M. 1986) - Pennsylvania Secretary of Education (2006–2010)

Entertainment and media

Sports

Miscellaneous
Edward Abbey (attended 1947) - author and environmentalist
William J. Boardley (1972) - Air National Guard Brigadier General
Rob Boston (1985) - author, Assistant Director for Communications for Americans United for Separation of Church and State
Patricia Robertson (1985) - NASA astronaut
Jim Self - tuba player; appeared on over 1500 movie soundtracks

References

Indiana University of Pennsylvania people
Indiana University of Pennsylvania